The 2005 Pitch and putt European Championship held in Overbetuwe (The Netherlands) was promoted by the European Pitch and Putt Association (EPPA), with 9 teams in competition.

Ireland won their fourth European Pitch and putt Championship.

Qualifying round

Pools round

Final round

Final standings

External links
European Pitch and Putt Championship 

Pitch and putt competitions